Homec may refer to several places in Slovenia: 

Homec, Domžale, a settlement in the Municipality of Domžale, central Slovenia
Homec, Kobarid, a settlement in the Municipality of Kobarid, western Slovenia
Homec, Vojnik, a settlement in the Municipality of Vojnik, northeastern Slovenia
Homec, Rečica ob Savinji, a settlement in the Municipality of Rečica ob Savinji, northeastern Slovenia